The 2012 Safeway Championship, Manitoba's men's provincial curling championship, was held from February 8 to 12 at the Credit Union Place in Dauphin, Manitoba. The winning team of Rob Fowler, will represent Manitoba at the 2012 Tim Hortons Brier in Saskatoon, Saskatchewan. This will be the 88th edition of the Manitoba men's curling championships.

Teams
Thirty-two teams qualify for the men's provincial championship in Manitoba. Berths 1–14 represent the rural zones, and berths 15–21 represent the Winnipeg zones. There were two separate bonspiels played earlier in the year, the Northern and Southern Bonspiels, representing the north and south; these represent berths 22 and 23. Berth 24 goes to the winner of the Brandon Bonspiel played around the same time of fall as the Northern and Southern floating bonspiels. Berth 25 goes to the prior year's Manitoban champion, assuming the team meets the requirements to represent themselves. The same goes for berths 26 and 27, which go to the Manitoba Curling Tour champion and the top Manitoban team on the Canadian Team Ranking System, respectively. Berth 27 must be declared by November 1, 2010. Numbers 28–32 are qualifiers from the MCA Bonspiel, also subject to subset rules and requirements.

Once all 32 teams have been qualified, they will be seeded respectively and slotted into the draw format of 1 vs 32, 2 vs 31, and so on.

Draw Brackets
32 team double knockout with playoff round
Four teams qualify each from A Event and B Event

A Event

B Event

Results
All times CST

Draw 1
February 8, 8:30am

Draw 2
February 8, 12:15pm

Draw 3
February 8, 4:00pm

Draw 4
February 8, 8:15pm

Draw 5
February 9, 8:30am

Draw 6
February 9, 12:15pm

Draw 7
February 9, 4:00pm

Draw 8
February 9, 7:45pm

Draw 9
February 10, 8:30am

Draw 10
February 10, 12:15pm

Draw 11
February 10, 4:00pm

Playoffs

Playoff round
8 team double knockout
Four teams qualify into Championship Round

First round
February 10, 7:45pm

Second round
February 11, 9:00am

Third round
February 11, 2:00pm

Championship Round

1 vs. 2
February 11, 6:30 PM

3 vs. 4
February 11, 6:30 PM

Semifinal
February 12, 9:00 AM

Final
February 12, 1:30 PM

References

Safeway Championship
Sport in Dauphin, Manitoba
Safeway Championship
Curling in Manitoba
Safeway Championship